Julie Rebecca Rubin (born November 25, 1972) is a United States district judge of the United States District Court for the District of Maryland. She served as Maryland state court judge from 2013 to 2022.

Early life and education 

Rubin was born on November 25, 1972, in Baltimore, Maryland. She received her Bachelor of Arts, cum laude, from Mount Holyoke College in 1995 and her Juris Doctor from the University of Maryland School of Law in 1998.

Legal and judicial career 

From 1998 to 2000, Rubin was an associate at the Baltimore law firm Shapiro and Olander, P.A. From 2000 to 2012, she worked at Astrachan Gunst Thomas Rubin, P.C. in Baltimore where she handled intellectual property and employment law matters. She served as a judge of the 8th Judicial Circuit of the Baltimore City Circuit Court from January 9, 2013 to March 30, 2022.

Rubin was a member of the legal committee of Baltimore Neighborhoods, Inc., from 2010 to 2013.

Federal judicial service 

On November 3, 2021, President Joe Biden nominated Rubin to serve as a United States district judge of the United States District Court for the District of Maryland. Biden nominated Rubin to the seat being vacated by Judge Ellen Lipton Hollander, who will assume senior status upon confirmation of a successor. On December 15, 2021, a hearing on her nomination was held before the Senate Judiciary Committee. On January 3, 2022, her nomination was returned to the President under Rule XXXI, Paragraph 6 of the United States Senate; she was renominated the same day. On January 20, 2022, her nomination was reported out of committee by a 13–9 vote. On March 16, 2022, the United States Senate invoked cloture on her nomination by a 52–45 vote. On March 23, 2022, her nomination was confirmed by a 51–46 vote. She received her judicial commission on March 30, 2022.

References

External links 
 

1972 births
Living people
20th-century American women lawyers
20th-century American lawyers
21st-century American judges
21st-century American women lawyers
21st-century American lawyers
21st-century American women judges
Judges of the United States District Court for the District of Maryland
Lawyers from Baltimore
Maryland lawyers
Maryland state court judges
Mount Holyoke College alumni
United States district court judges appointed by Joe Biden
University of Maryland Francis King Carey School of Law alumni